The UEFA European Under-18 Championship 1996 Final Tournament was held in France and Luxembourg. It also served as the European qualification for the 1997 FIFA World Youth Championship.

Teams

The following teams qualified for the tournament:

 
 
  (host)

Group stage

Group A

Group B

Third place match

Final

Qualification to World Youth Championship
The six best performing teams qualified for the 1997 FIFA World Youth Championship.

See also
 1996 UEFA European Under-18 Championship qualifying

External links
Results by RSSSF

UEFA European Under-19 Championship
1996
Under-18
Under-18
UEFA Under 18
1996 in youth association football